The Advanced Aviation Husky, Hi-Nuski and Coyote are a family of American ultralight aircraft that was designed and produced by Advanced Aviation. The aircraft was supplied as a kit for amateur construction and introduced in 1978.

Design and development
It features a cable-braced high-wing, a single-seat, open cockpit, tricycle landing gear and a single engine in pusher configuration. The aircraft is described as a "RipSilver", an unlicensed clone of the Eipper Quicksilver, which it closely resembles.

The Husky is made from aluminum tubing, with the wings and tail surfaces covered in Dacron sailcloth. Its  span wing is cable braced from a single kingpost. The pilot is accommodated with a sling seat, suspended from the wing. The control system is unconventional with pitch controlled by weight shift, while roll is controlled by wing-mounted spoilers controlled by cables attached to the pilot's seat and actuated by weight shift. The tail surfaces are fixed.

The Husky was later developed into the Advanced Aviation Cobra.

Variants
Husky
Also called the Hi-Nusky.
Coyote

Specifications (Husky)

References

External links
Photo of a Husky in flight

1970s United States ultralight aircraft
Homebuilt aircraft
Single-engined pusher aircraft
Husky